Eubank is a surname of Old English origin in use since the 13th century, derived from the phrase yew-bank, referring to those who lived near a ridge of yew. Historical spellings include Ewbanke, Ewbanck, Ewbancke, Ewbanche, Ubank, Yuebanc, and Ewbank. 1

People with the surname
 Chris Eubank, boxer
 Chris Eubank, Jr., boxer, son of above referenced Chris Eubank.
 Damon R. Eubank, Kentucky historian
 Danielle Eubank, American artist
 Harold P. Eubank (1924–2006), American physicist
 James R. Eubank, American politician
 James Eubanks, better known as Clayster, professional Call of Duty player
 Mark Eubank, American television meteorologist
 Shari Eubank, adult film actress
 William Eubank, cinematographer

Fictional characters
Balph Eubank, character in Atlas Shrugged

See also
Eubanks (disambiguation)
Ewbank (disambiguation)